Andreu Guerao Mayoral (born 17 June 1983), known simply as Andreu, is a Spanish footballer who plays as a midfielder.

Club career
Born in Barcelona, Catalonia, Andreu made his professional debut with FC Barcelona B in the third division, and was not able to prevent Atlético Malagueño's relegation to that level the following season. In July 2006 he joined Sporting de Gijón, appearing in only six games as the Asturias club returned to La Liga in 2007–08, and accomplishing the same in the following campaign.

In late January 2010, after having only collected a few minutes in the season's Copa del Rey, Andreu was released by Sporting, joining Polish side Polonia Warsaw – managed by countryman José Mari Bakero – and penning a one and a half year deal. On 14 May he scored in a local derby against Legia Warsaw, the match's only.

After not having his contract with the Ekstraklasa team extended, Andreu signed with New Zealand's Auckland City FC. He subsequently had short spells with FC Dinamo Tbilisi and Lechia Gdańsk, appearing rarely for both teams.

After three seasons back in Spain with Racing de Santander, Andreu signed for the Western Sydney Wanderers FC of the A-League. On 5 May 2016, after having helped the latter reach the Grand Final, he was released.

On 9 August 2017, after a brief spell in Greece, 34-year-old Andreu returned to the Australian top division when he joined Perth Glory FC, reuniting with former Sporting teammate Diego Castro in the process. After the regular season, he left.

Personal life
Andreu's older brother, Antonio, was also a professional footballer. He was also groomed at FC Barcelona, but never appeared in higher than the third level as a professional, also playing one year in Scotland.

In addition to his native Spanish, Andreu can also speak English.

Club statistics

References

External links

1983 births
Living people
Footballers from Barcelona
Spanish footballers
Association football midfielders
La Liga players
Segunda División players
Segunda División B players
Tercera División players
FC Barcelona C players
FC Barcelona Atlètic players
Atlético Malagueño players
Sporting de Gijón players
Racing de Santander players
Ekstraklasa players
Polonia Warsaw players
Lechia Gdańsk players
New Zealand Football Championship players
Auckland City FC players
Erovnuli Liga players
FC Dinamo Tbilisi players
A-League Men players
Western Sydney Wanderers FC players
Perth Glory FC players
Football League (Greece) players
Aris Thessaloniki F.C. players
Spanish expatriate footballers
Expatriate footballers in Poland
Expatriate association footballers in New Zealand
Expatriate footballers in Georgia (country)
Expatriate soccer players in Australia
Expatriate footballers in Greece
Spanish expatriate sportspeople in Poland
Spanish expatriate sportspeople in New Zealand
Spanish expatriate sportspeople in Georgia (country)
Spanish expatriate sportspeople in Australia
Spanish expatriate sportspeople in Greece